Willowsia buski, the damp grain springtail, is a species of slender springtail in the family Entomobryidae. It is found in abundance throughout North America and Europe, and likely has a cosmopolitan distribution. It can sometimes be found infesting stores of dry goods (like grain) that have become contaminated with high moisture, giving rise to the name "damp grain springtail".

Description
Willowsia buski is a medium-sized springtail, averaging 1-2mm in length. It has a smooth, dark-purple to black appearance, with fine setae present over the body's surface. The head is generally a lighter color, allowing for easy distinction from similar species. Like all members of Entomobryidae, it has four, roughly equal antennal segments.

References

Collembola
Articles created by Qbugbot
Animals described in 1870
Storage pests
Agricultural pest arthropods